Rehavia Gymnasium or the Jerusalem Rehavia Gymnasium, by its Hebrew name Gymnasia Rehavia, is a high school in the Rehavia neighborhood in West Jerusalem.

History
The high school's initial name was the Hebrew Gymnasium in Jerusalem.

Gymnasia Rehavia was Jerusalem's first and the country’s second modern Jewish high school or gymnasium, after the Herzliya Hebrew Gymnasium in Tel Aviv. The school was first established in Jerusalem's Bukharan Quarter in 1909, by members of the loosely organized group of artists who named themselves "The New Jerusalem", for lack of an appropriate school framework in Jerusalem for their children. The building on Keren Kayemet Street in the Rehavia neighborhood was built in 1928. Among the founders were Dr. Naftali and Hannah Weitz, Yehoshua Barzilay, Yitzhak Ben-Zvi, later the second president of Israel, his wife Rachel Yanait and the artist Ira Jan. The latter three were also among its first teachers.

In July 2009, the high school celebrated its centennial at an event attended by generations of alumni, many of whom are leading figures in Israeli society today.

Notable alumni

 Shmuel Agmon (born 1922), mathematician
Naomi Ben-Ami (born 1960), government official
Yitzhak Danziger (1916–77), sculptor
Trude Dothan (1922–2016), archaeologist specialised in Philistine culture
Avraham "Avi" Gabbay (born 1967), businessman and politician
Ephraim Katzir (1916–2009), biophysicist, politician, 4th President of Israel (1973–1978)
Dan Meridor (born 1947), politician and government minister
Sallai Meridor (born 1955), politician and diplomat
Uzi Narkiss (1925–1997), IDF general
Miriam Naor (born 1947), President of the Supreme Court (2015–2017)
Yoni Netanyahu (1946–76), commander of Sayeret Matkal; killed during Operation Entebbe
Amos Oz (1939–2018), writer, novelist, journalist, and academic
Reuven Rivlin (born 1939), politician, lawyer, 10th President of Israel (2014–2021)
Eli Salzberger (born 1960), law professor
Nahman Shai (born 1946), journalist and politician
Chemi Shalev (born 1953), journalist
Matan Vilnai (born 1944), politician and a former Major General
Yigael Yadin (1917–84), archeologist, politician, and Chief of Staff of the Israel Defense Forces
A. B. Yehoshua (born 1936), novelist, essayist and playwright
Rehavam Ze'evi (1926–2001), general and politician
Gideon Schocken (1919–1981), major general, former head of the Manpower Directorate

References

Schools in Jerusalem
High schools in Israel
1909 establishments in the Ottoman Empire
Educational institutions established in 1909
Rehavia